BBC v Hearn [1977] ICR 686 is a UK labour law case, concerning collective action and the scope of a "trade dispute" under what is now TULRCA 1992 section 244.

Facts
The BBC wanted an injunction to restrain Hearn and the Association of Broadcasting Staff from stopping broadcast of the 1977 FA Cup Final. ABS objected to transmission unless the BBC agreed to not broadcast to South Africa.

In the High Court, Pain J held that the proposed action was in contemplation or furtherance of a trade dispute.

Judgment
Lord Denning MR held that the injunction was to be granted, because it was not strictly a dispute over terms and conditions of work.

See also

UK labour law
Hadmor Productions Ltd v Hamilton [1983] 1 AC 191 at 227, 233–234, approving Hearn
Re P (a minor) [2003] UKHL 8

Notes

References

United Kingdom labour case law